Totter may refer to:

People with the surname Totter
Audrey Totter (1917–2013), American actress
Stephen Totter (born 1963), American operatic baritone
Sylvia Totter, a member of The Bonnie Systers trio

Other uses
Totter, an alternative term for a Rag-and-bone man